Bullets for Rustlers is a 1940 American Western film directed by Sam Nelson and written by John Rathmell. The film stars Charles Starrett, Lorna Gray, Bob Nolan, Dick Curtis, Kenneth MacDonald and Jack Rockwell. The film was released on March 5, 1940, by Columbia Pictures.

Plot

Cast          
Charles Starrett as Steve Beaumont
Lorna Gray as Ann Houston
Bob Nolan as Bob
Dick Curtis as Strang
Kenneth MacDonald as Ed Brock
Jack Rockwell as Sheriff Webb
Edward LeSaint as Judge Baxter
Francis Walker as Ellis
Eddie Laughton as Shorty 
Lee Prather as Tom Andrews
Wally Wales as Eb Smith

References

External links
 

1940 films
American Western (genre) films
1940 Western (genre) films
Columbia Pictures films
Films directed by Sam Nelson
American black-and-white films
1940s English-language films
1940s American films